In French, La Famille Passiflore can refer to:

Beechwood Bunny Tales, a series of children's books by Geneviève Huriet, Amélie Sarn and Loïc Jouannigot
The Bellflower Bunnies, a TF1 animated series based on these books.